Baoris pagana is a species of skipper butterfly found in Asia.

Description

References

Hesperiinae
Fauna of Pakistan
Butterflies of Indochina